David Boyle, 7th Earl of Glasgow,  (31 May 1833 – 13 December 1915), was a British naval commander and colonial governor. He served as Governor of New Zealand between 1892 and 1897.

Background
Boyle was the son of Patrick Boyle (eldest son of David Boyle, Lord Boyle, by his first wife, Elizabeth Montgomerie). His mother was Mary Frances Elphinstone-Dalrymple, daughter of Sir Robert Dalrymple-Horn-Elphinstone, 1st Baronet. He succeeded in the earldom in 1890.

Royal Navy
Boyle served with the Royal Navy during the Crimean and Second Opium Wars. He was commander of  when the ship wrecked in 1874. He retired with the rank of captain.

Governor of New Zealand
Boyle was the Governor of New Zealand from 1892 to 1897. He was the cousin of another Governor, Sir James Fergusson. The Wellington suburb of Kelburn in New Zealand is named after Viscount Kelburn, the son of Boyle.

Upon his return to the UK, Lord Glasgow was elevated to the Peerage of the United Kingdom in 1897 as Baron Fairlie, of Fairlie in the County of Ayr, to enable him to sit in the House of Lords (the Earldom of Glasgow and all its subsidiary titles being in the Peerage of Scotland).

Later life
Lord Glasgow took an active interest in the city of Glasgow.

He received the honorary Doctor of Laws (LL.D) from the University of Glasgow when they celebrated the 450th jubilee in June 1901.

Family
Lord Glasgow married Dorothea Elizabeth Thomasina Hunter-Blair (eldest daughter of Sir Edward Hunter-Blair, 4th Baronet, and his wife Elizabeth, daughter of George Wauchope), on 23 July 1873. They had five sons and three daughters:

 Capt. Patrick James Boyle, 8th Earl of Glasgow (born 18 June 1874, died 14 December 1963)
 Lt. Hon Edward George Boyle (born 16 June 1875, died 23 October 1898), unmarried.
 Lady Augusta Helen Elizabeth Boyle (born 25 August 1876, died 12 May 1967), married (1) on 28 April 1898 Charles Lindsay Orr-Ewing (who died in 1903) and (2) on 30 July 1914 Thomas Inskip, 1st Viscount Caldecote.
 Lady Alice Mary Boyle (born 18 December 1877, died 1 Jan 1958), married on 18 July 1901 General Sir Charles Fergusson of Kilkerran, 7th Bt.
 Lady Dorothy Montagu Boyle (born 14 March 1879, died 17 March 1968), married on 25 April 1899 Gathorne Gathorne-Hardy, 3rd Earl of Cranbrook.
 Capt. Hon. James Boyle (born 11 March 1880, killed in action 18 October 1914), married 15 September 1908 Katherine Isabel Salvin Bowlby.
 Air Cdre Hon. John David Boyle, CBE, DSO. (born 8 July 1884, died 1974), married (1) on 9 December 1913 Ethel Hodges (who died 1932) and (2) on 4 October 1934 Marie Gibb.
 Hon. Alan Reginald Boyle (born 8 October 1886, died 10 October 1958), married on 5 February 1916 to Isabel Julia Hull.

Lord Glasgow died in December 1915, aged 82, and was succeeded in the earldom by his eldest son, Patrick. The Countess of Glasgow died in January 1923.

References

External links

1833 births
1915 deaths
Governors-General of New Zealand
Knights Grand Cross of the Order of St Michael and St George
Earls of Glasgow
David
Directors of the Glasgow and South Western Railway
Peers of the United Kingdom created by Queen Victoria